The Student Loan Trust is a statutory agency of the Government of Ghana established in December 2005 under the Trustee Incorporation Act 1962, Act 106. The Trust was set up to provide financial resources students and to help promote and facilitate the national ideals stipulated by the Constitution of Ghana.

References

Education in Ghana